The Lorraine 12E Courlis was a W-12 (broad arrow) aero engine produced by the French company Lorraine-Dietrich during the 1920s and 1930s.

Variants
12E
12Eb
12Ebr
12Ed
12Edr
12Ee
12EwThe standard Eb fitted with a supplementary supercharger.
Elizalde A The 12E built under licence in Spain by Elizalde S.A.

Applications

Aircraft

 Aichi AB-1
 Bernard SIMB V.1
 Blériot-SPAD S.86
 Breguet 19
 Canete Pirata
 Caudron C.17
 Dewoitine D.12
 Dewoitine D.25
 FMA AeT.1
 Grigorovich MR-2
 Grigorovich ROM-1
 Hiro H1H
 Levasseur PL.4
 Levasseur PL.5
 Levasseur PL.8
 Lioré et Olivier LeO H-134
 Potez 24
 Potez 25
 Potez 26
 PWS-10
 Rohrbach Ro IIIa Rodra
 SET 2
 Villiers II
 Villiers XXIV
 Wibault 73
 Yokosuka E1Y

Other applications
 Argentine Nahuel tank

Specifications (12Ed)

See also

References

Notes

Bibliography

 Gunston, Bill. World Encyclopedia of Aero Engines. Cambridge, England. Patrick Stephens Limited, 1989. 

1920s aircraft piston engines
12E
W engines